Wainui River is the name of four rivers in New Zealand. There are also several streams in New Zealand called Wainui Stream. Furthermore, several other New Zealand rivers have names starting in "Wainui-", and some of these (most notably the Wainuiomata River) are colloquially known as "The Wainui River". This is perhaps unsurprising - "Wainui" is Māori for "big water/river".

 Wainui River (Bay of Plenty)
 Wainui River (Hawke's Bay)
 Wainui River (Northland)
 Wainui River (Tasman)

References